Erik Charles Nielsen (born May 8, 1981) is an American actor and comedian.

Early life
Nielsen was born in West Sayville, New York. He is of Danish descent. Nielsen graduated from Palm Bay High School in 1999. While attending Boston University, he was named the funniest comedian on campus. After continuing to hone his act at The Comedy Studio in Cambridge, Massachusetts, he moved to Los Angeles, California to do a Ph.D. program at the University of California, Los Angeles, but withdrew before completion. Turning to comedy full-time, he got his first big break at the 2007 U.S. Comedy Arts Festival in Aspen, Colorado.

Career
Nielsen is best known for his recurring role as Garrett Lambert in the television comedy series Community from 2009 to 2015. His other acting credits include Bad Milo (2013) and the pilot episode of IFC's Maron. He also starred in Erik the Librarian, a web series created by Brent Forrester.

Nielsen has appeared on Just for Laughs, Conan, and on HBO Canada's stand-up series Funny as Hell. 

On December 10, 2014 he appeared on Ken Reid's TV Guidance Counselor Podcast.

Filmography

References

External links

Living people
American male actors
1981 births
Boston University alumni
University of California, Los Angeles alumni
People from Islip (town), New York
Comedians from New York (state)
21st-century American comedians